The Brutalist Bricks is the sixth album by the northeast American punk band Ted Leo and the Pharmacists. It was released March 9, 2010 by Matador Records. It is the band's first album for Matador Records.

The album received a nod from Exclaim! as the No. 3 Punk Album of 2010.

Track listing

All songs written by Ted Leo.

"The Mighty Sparrow" - 2:37
"Mourning in America" - 2:59
"Ativan Eyes" - 4:22
"Even Heroes Have to Die" - 3:46
"The Stick" - 1:57
"Bottled in Cork" - 3:18
"Woke Up Near Chelsea" - 3:51
"One Polaroid a Day" - 4:10
"Where Was My Brain?" - 2:19
"Bartolomeo and the Buzzing of Bees" - 3:21
"Tuberculoids Arrive in Hop" - 2:26
"Gimme the Wire" - 2:55
"Last Days" - 3:47
"Everything Gets Interrupted" (iTunes Exclusive Bonus Track) - 2:39

Personnel
 Ted Leo - guitar/vocals
 James Canty - guitar
 Marty Key - bass
 Chris Wilson - drums

Chart performance

References

2010 albums
Ted Leo and the Pharmacists albums
Matador Records albums